The Episcopal Diocese of Rhode Island is a diocese of the Episcopal Church in the United States of America, encompassing the state of Rhode Island. It is one of seven New England dioceses that make up Province 1.

The former Episcopal seat of the diocese, the Cathedral of St. John is at 271 North Main Street in the see city of Providence. It has subsequently been closed. There are 51 parishes in the diocese, with  14,678 members and 10,644 communicants. The bishop is the Right Reverend W. Nicholas Knisely, the thirteenth office holder.

History
The diocese was founded in 1790 by two clergy and five members of the laity, representatives of the four charter churches of the diocese, King's Church in Providence (1722), Trinity Church in Newport (1698), St. Paul's in North Kingstown (1707), and St. Michael's in Bristol (1720). Without sufficient resources to support a bishop of their own, they elected Samuel Seabury, who was bishop of Connecticut, to hold the office of bishop of Rhode Island as well. Under Rhode Island's third bishop, Alexander Viets Griswold, the Episcopal Church in Rhode Island expanded from 200 communicants in four parishes to almost 2,000 in seventeen parishes. This growth continued under the next two bishops, John P. K. Henshaw and Thomas M. Clark, and this trend was supported by the immigration of many English Anglicans. By the end of the 19th century, the diocese had grown to 35 parishes.

In the first part of the 20th century, the Episcopal Church in Rhode Island focused on urban ministry with a focus on social concerns, led by Bishop William N. McVickar. The first deaconess was ordained in 1890, and from 1910 to 1914 the number of women serving in this position and ordained by Bishop James D. Perry had grown from one to seven.  Under Perry and his successor, Gaylord G. Bennett, the number of parishes continued to grow.

From 1955 to 1972, the diocese was led by John Seville Higgins, who started campus ministries and a number of other missions. Bishop Frederick H. Belden led the church through the transitions occasioned by the ordination of women to the priesthood, ordaining Jo-Ann J. Drake to the transitional diaconate in 1977 and to the priesthood in 1978, (Patrica A. Smith, ordained deacon by Bishop Belden in 1976, continued her studies for the priesthood and was ordained in 1980) and adoption of the 1979 Book of Common Prayer. Belden was succeeded by George Hunt, who served as bishop from 1980 to 1994. Hunt led a crusade for accountability by the state government on the issues of corruption, organized crime and gambling. He also insisted that the process for ordination in the diocese not discriminate against anyone on the basis of gender or sexual orientation. In 1996, Geralyn Wolf was consecrated, becoming one of the few women serving as a diocesan bishop.

There are a few parishes with a sizable percentage of African-American parishioners, and some congregations that have become the spiritual homes for people who have fled the civil war in Liberia. There is an active Spanish speaking congregation in Central Falls and another in Cranston. Most congregations make a point of openly welcoming gay and lesbian members.

Bishops of Rhode Island

These are the bishops who have served the Diocese of Rhode Island:
 Samuel Seabury (1790–1796)
 Edward Bass (1798–1803)
 Alexander Viets Griswold (1811–1843)
 John P. K. Henshaw (1843–1852)
 Thomas March Clark (1854–1903)* William N. McVickar, Coadjutor Bishop (1898–1903)
 William N. McVickar (1903–1910)
 James DeWolf Perry (1911–1946)* Granville G. Bennett, Suffragan Bishop (elected 1939)
 Granville G. Bennett (1946–1954)* John S. Higgins, Coadjutor Bishop (1953–1955) 
 John Seville Higgins (1955–1972)* Frederick H. Belden, Coadjutor Bishop (1971–1972) 
 Frederick H. Belden (1972–1979) 
 George N. Hunt, III (1980–1994) 
 Geralyn Wolf (1996–2012)
 W. Nicholas Knisely (2012–present)

Churches of Rhode Island

Bristol County

St. John's Episcopal Church, Barrington
St. Matthew's Episcopal Church, Barrington
St. Michael's Episcopal Church, Bristol
St. Mark's Episcopal Church, Warren - closed May 2010

Kent County
Church of St. Andrew and St. Philip, Coventry
St. Francis Episcopal Church, Coventry
St. Matthias's Episcopal Church, Coventry
St. Luke's Episcopal Church, East Greenwich
St. Mark's, Warwick
St. Mary's Episcopal Church, Warwick
All Saints' Episcopal Church, Warwick
St. Barnabas Episcopal Church, Warwick

Newport County
St. Matthew's Parish, Jamestown 
St. Andrew's-by-the-Sea, Compton
Church of the Holy Cross (Middletown, Rhode Island)
St. Columba's Chapel (Middletown, Rhode Island)  homepage
St. George's School, Middletown
Emmanuel Church (Newport, Rhode Island)  homepage
St. George's Episcopal Church, Newport - closed circa 2010
Trinity Church (Newport, Rhode Island)  homepage
Zabriskie Memorial Church of St. John the Evangelist Church, Newport
St. Mary's Episcopal Church, Portsmouth 
St. Paul's, Portsmouth 
Holy Trinity Church, Tiverton

Providence County

St. George's Episcopal Church, Central Falls
St. David's on-the-Hill Episcopal Church, Cranston 
Church of the Transfiguration, Edgewood
Church of the Ascension, Cranston 
Trinity Church, Cranston
Emmanuel Episcopal Church, Cumberland   homepage
St. John's Episcopal Church, Ashton (Cumberland)
Church of Epiphany East Providence 
St. Mary's Episcopal Church, East Providence
St. Thomas, Greenville
Christ Church, Lincoln
St. James, North Providence
St. Alban's Episcopal Church, Centerdale (North Providence) 
Trinity Episcopal Church, North Scituate 
Calvary Episcopal Church, Pascoag 
St. Luke's, Pawtucket
Church of the Advent, Pawtucket
Good Shepherd, Pawtucket
St. Paul's Episcopal Church, Pawtucket homepage 
St. Martin's, Pawtucket
All Saints' Memorial Church, Providence
St. Martin's Episcopal Church, Providence homepage
Grace Church (Providence, Rhode Island)
S. Stephen's Church, Providence homepage
Cathedral of St. John, Providence (closed)
Church of the Redeemer, Providence 
Church of the Messiah, Providence (closed)
St. Peter's and St. Andrew's Church, Providence homepage
St. Mark's, Riverside
St. Michael & Grace, Rumford
St. James's, Woonsocket

Washington County
St. Ann's by-the Sea Episcopal Church, Block island 
Church of the Holy Spirit, Charlestown
Saint Elizabeth's, Hope Valley (Hopkinton)
St. Augustine's Episcopal Church, Kingston 
St. Peter's by-the-Sea Episcopal Church, Narragansett 
St. Paul's Episcopal Church, Wickford, North Kingstown
Chapel of St. John the Divine, Sauderstown
Church of the Ascension, Wakefield
Christ Church, Westerly
St. Thomas's, Alton (Wood River Junction)

See also
List of Succession of Bishops for the Episcopal Church, USA

Notes

External links
Official Web site of the Diocese of Rhode Island
Official Web site of the Episcopal Church
Journal of the Annual Convention, Diocese of Rhode Island at the Online Books Page

Rhode Island
Episcopal churches in Rhode Island
Episcopal Church in Rhode Island
Religious organizations established in 1790
Anglican dioceses established in the 18th century
Province 1 of the Episcopal Church (United States)